Software tools for surveys are varied, ranging from desktop applications to complex web systems for monitoring consumer behaviour. The tables includes general and technical information for notable Computer-assisted survey information collection (CASIC) software.

See also 
 Comparison of statistical packages
 Computer-assisted qualitative data analysis software

References

survey software